The Young Artist Award (originally known as the Youth in Film Award) is an accolade presented by the Young Artist Foundation, a nonprofit organization founded in 1978 to honor excellence of youth performers, and to provide scholarships for young artists who may be physically disabled or financially unstable.

First presented in 1979, the Young Artist Awards was the first organization established to specifically recognize and award the contributions of performers under the age of 18 in the fields of film, television, theater, and music.

The 1st Youth In Film Awards ceremony was held in October 1979, at the Sheraton Universal Hotel in Hollywood to honor outstanding young performers of the 1978/1979 season.

Young Artist Association 
The Young Artist Association (originally known as the Hollywood Women's Photo and Press Club, and later, the Youth in Film Association) is a non-profit organization founded in 1978 to recognize and award excellence of youth performers, and to provide scholarships for young artists who may be physically or financially challenged. The Young Artist Association was the first organization to establish an awards ceremony specifically set to recognize and award the contributions of performers under the age of 21 in the fields of film, television, theater, and music.

Young Artist Foundation 
The Young Artist Foundation is a non-profit 501(c) organization founded in 1978 by long-standing Hollywood Foreign Press (Golden Globes) member Maureen Dragone and dedicated to presenting scholarships to physically or financially challenged aspiring young artists, allowing them to pursue a career in entertainment by attending a performing arts school of their choice. The scholarship program is funded through donations including contribution from the Hollywood Foreign Press Association.

Young Artist Awards

History 
The Young Artist Awards are presented annually by the Young Artist Association. Originally known as the Youth In Film Awards for the first twenty years, the name was officially changed to the Young Artist Awards for the 21st annual awards ceremony in March 2000. Playfully referred to as the "Kiddie Oscars", the Young Artist Awards are regarded as young Hollywood's answer to the Academy Awards, recognizing children for their work within the entertainment industry.

First presented for the 1978–1979 entertainment season, the awards were envisioned by Maureen Dragone, as a way to honor talented young people in film, television, and music who might otherwise be eclipsed by their adult co-stars. Two notable examples that year being young Ricky Schroder in The Champ and Justin Henry in Kramer vs. Kramer, who were each nominated for Golden Globes in the same categories as their adult counterparts. Originally held in the autumn in its early years, the awards ceremony has traditionally taken place in the spring for more than 20 years.

Statuette 
The original Youth In Film Award was a statuette was similar to a miniature Oscar. A gilded figure of a man holding a laurel wreath instead of a sword and standing upon a relatively large "trophy" style base. The current Young Artist Award statuette, is a figure displaying a five-pointed star above its head and standing upon a smaller base. In addition to the Young Artist Award statuette presented to the winners, all nominees are presented with a special nomination plaque at the ceremony, commemorating their nominations in their respective categories.

Voting 
Candidates considered for nomination must be between the ages of 5 and 21 and are usually submitted for consideration by producers or by the young artist's agent or manager. Submissions are traditionally due by the end of January to mid-February and nominees are announced about one month later at an annual nomination ceremony and party. Originally conceived of as a way to acknowledge young artists under the age of 21, the focus of the awards has shifted over time to focus primarily on young artists who were under the age of 18 at the time of principal production of the project for which they are nominated.

Winners are selected by members of the Young Artist Association. Originally known as the Hollywood Women's Photo and Press Club, and later, the Youth in Film Association, the general membership was originally composed of 88 journalists and photographers, who were active in various branches of the arts. Today, the Young Artist Association has a voting board of over 125 members composed of journalists, agents, and former child performers. Winners are selected by secret ballot of all associated with the Young Artist Association as well as former nominees.

Categories 
The various Young Artist Awards categories have evolved extensively since the first awards were presented. Originally beginning with only 11 competitive categories in 1979, the first categories included "Best Juvenile Actor and Actress in a Motion Picture", "Best Juvenile Actor and Actress in a TV Series or Special", "Best Juvenile Actor and Actress in a Daytime TV Series", and "Best Male and Female Juvenile Recording Artist", as well as competitive categories honoring studios and networks for "family friendly" films and television programming.

Over time, the competitive categories have been expanded to include "Best Young Actor and Actress in an International Feature Film", "Best Young Actor and Actress in a Short Film", "Best Young Supporting Actor and Actress in Film", "Best Young Ensemble Cast", "Best Young Recurring Actor and Actress in a TV Series", and "Best Young Guest-starring Actor and Actress in a TV Series", with many of the categories being split to acknowledge young artists age 10 and under in their own separate categories. In addition to its well-known film and television awards, the association has also recognized the achievements of youth in other fields of the performing arts over the years, including theater, dance, commercials, journalism, radio, and stand-up comedy.

Special Awards 
While many of the acting categories have been expanded over time, some early competitive categories such as "Best Juvenile Recording Artist", "Best Family Motion Picture", and "Best Family TV Series" have been phased out over the years, with accolades for those achievements now being bestowed in the form of special "Honorary" awards.

The foundation's most notable annual honorary awards include the "Jackie Coogan Award", often presented to film studios, producers, or directors for their "Outstanding Contribution To Youth Through Entertainment", and the "Former Child Star Award", presented as the foundation's "Lifetime Achievement Award" honoring former child stars for their achievements.

Ceremony 
The ceremony is held annually in Hollywood and has traditionally been considered one of the more formal children's awards ceremonies, with honorees and their chaperones "dressing-up" for the occasion and arriving in limousines. All members of the press are invited to attend the pre-show red carpet arrivals as young celebrity attendees make their entrances and sign autographs, and each year's presenters are often selected from the previous year's young winners or from that year's list of nominees. After the ceremony is the annual banquet dinner and then dancing with live musical entertainment often provided by talented young musical artists of the day.

The first Youth In Film Awards were presented in October 1979 at a banquet ceremony held at the Sheraton Universal Hotel in Hollywood, California.

See also 
 List of American television awards
 Academy Juvenile Award
 Broadcast Film Critics Association Award for Best Young Performer
 Saturn Award for Best Performance by a Younger Actor

References

External links 
 
 Young Artist Awards photographs at LIFE.com

Acting awards
Young Artist Awards
Awards established in 1979
American film awards
American television awards
Performing arts trophies
2015 in American cinema
2015 in American television
2015 in California